Alexander Zaytsev may refer to:
Alexander Dmitryevich Zaytsev (1903–1982), Russian painter and art educator
Alexander Andreyevich Zaytsev (1911–1965), Soviet aircraft pilot and Hero of the Soviet Union
Alexander Gennadiyevich Zaytsev (born 1952), Russian figure skater
Aleksandr Leonidovich Zaytsev (born 1945), Russian scientist in radar astronomy and SETI
Alexander Mikhaylovich Zaytsev (1841–1910), Russian chemist
Alexander Nikolayevich Zaytsev (1935–1971), Russian chess grandmaster

See also 
Zaytsev